Cyclopeltis is a genus of ferns in the family Lomariopsidaceae according to the Pteridophyte Phylogeny Group classification of 2016 (PPG I).

Taxonomy
Cyclopeltis was first described by John Smith in 1846.

Species
, the Checklist of Ferns and Lycophytes of the World and Plants of the World Online recognized the following species:
Cyclopeltis crenata (Fée) C.Chr.
Cyclopeltis kingii (Hance) Hosok.
Cyclopeltis mirabilis Copel.
Cyclopeltis novoguineensis Rosenst.
Cyclopeltis presliana (J.Sm.) Berk.
Cyclopeltis rigida Holttum
Cyclopeltis semicordata (Sw.) J.Sm.

References

Polypodiales
Fern genera